Jerry Needam (born 2 March 1966) is a journalist, newspaper publisher and politician from Rivers State, a reverend and diocesan media communicator of the Christ Army Church of Nigeria (CACN), former editor of the Ogoni Star newspaper, and owner of the Nigerian weekly tabloid National Network. He is Special Adviser on Media and Publicity to Felix A. Obuah, the Rivers State People's Democratic Party chairman. He is also a former Spokesperson of the Action Congress of Rivers State.

See also
National Network (newspaper)
List of people from Rivers State
Movement for the Survival of the Ogoni People

References

1966 births
Living people
Journalists from Rivers State
Rivers State Peoples Democratic Party politicians
Ogoni people
Nigerian Christian clergy
Nigerian company founders